Elizabeth Stanhope may refer to:
 Elizabeth Stanhope, Countess of Chesterfield (d. 1665) (1640–1665), second wife of Philip Stanhope, 2nd Earl of Chesterfield
 Elizabeth Lyon, Countess of Strathmore (1663–1723), daughter of above
 Elizabeth Stanhope, Countess of Chesterfield (d. 1677), third wife of Philip Stanhope, 2nd Earl of Chesterfield
 Elizabeth Stanhope, Countess of Chesterfield (d. 1708), wife of Philip Stanhope, 3rd Earl of Chesterfield